Tobias Lund Andresen (born 20 August 2002) is a Danish cyclist, who currently rides for UCI WorldTeam .

Major results

Road

2019
 1st E3 BinckBank Classic Junioren
 2nd Tour of Flanders Juniors
2020
 1st  Road race, National Junior Championships
 1st   Overall Visegrad 4 Juniors
1st Stages 1, 2a (ITT), 2b & 3
 Grand Prix Rüebliland
1st  Points classification
1st Stages 2 & 3
2021
 1st Stage 7 Tour de Bretagne
2022
 9th Paris–Tours Espoirs

Track
2019
 1st  Team pursuit, National Championships
2020
 1st  Madison (with Kasper Andersen), UEC European Junior Championships

References

External links

2002 births
Living people
Danish male cyclists
People from Høje-Taastrup Municipality